Zahir Khan (born 20 December 1998) is an Afghan cricketer. He made his Test match debut for the Afghanistan cricket team in September 2019. He made his first-class debut for Afghanistan against Papua New Guinea in the 2015–17 ICC Intercontinental Cup on 21 November 2015. He played for the Afghanistan U-19 team in the 2016 Under-19 Cricket World Cup.

Domestic career
He made his List A debut for Band-e-Amir Region in the 2017 Ghazi Amanullah Khan Regional One Day Tournament on 10 August 2017. Along with Karim Janat, he was the joint-leading wicket-taker in the tournament, with twelve dismissals. He made his Twenty20 debut for Mis Ainak Knights in the 2017 Shpageeza Cricket League on 12 September 2017.

In August 2018, he joined the English side Lancashire for the rest of the season. He was the leading wicket-taker in the 2019 Ahmad Shah Abdali 4-day Tournament, with thirty dismissals in five matches.

T20 franchise career
In September 2018, he was named in Nangarhar's squad in the first edition of the Afghanistan Premier League tournament. In October 2018, he was named in the squad for the Khulna Titans team, following the draft for the 2018–19 Bangladesh Premier League.

In 2018 he signed for the Rajasthan Royals in the Indian Premier League however he was ruled out of the season due to injury. He played for the Jamaica Tallawahs in the Caribbean Premier League in 2019 and he signed for the Brisbane Heat for the Big Bash League for the 2019-20 season and stated "“This is a very exciting thing for me, especially to be joining the team where my good friend Mujeeb played last year. He told me great things about Brisbane Heat, so I am looking forward to this challenge so much.” He did not resign with the Heat for the following season, and head coach Darren Lehmann said the following regarding his time with the club: “On behalf of the club, we really wish Tom and Zahir all the best for what lies ahead with their cricket as they both have enormous potential. . . It was great to see them display their ability and we thoroughly enjoyed having them in the squad. We hope they got plenty out of the experience." 

He signed for the Melbourne Stars for the 2020-21 Big Bash season saying “I’m really looking forward to playing for the Stars during this BBL season. The squad is looking strong and I’d like to thank the club for giving me the chance to be part of it. Together I am sure we will build a successful season.”

International career
In December 2017, he was named in Afghanistan's squad for the 2018 Under-19 Cricket World Cup. In January 2018, he was bought by the Rajasthan Royals in the 2018 IPL auction. In December 2018, he was named in Afghanistan's under-23 team for the 2018 ACC Emerging Teams Asia Cup.

In May 2018, he was named in Afghanistan's squad for their inaugural Test match, played against India, but he was not selected for the match.

In February 2019, he was named in Afghanistan's One Day International (ODI) and Twenty20 International (T20I) squads for their series against Ireland in India. He made his ODI debut for Afghanistan against Ireland on 10 March 2019. Following the conclusion of the ODI series, he was added to Afghanistan's Test squad, for the one-off match against Ireland, but he did not play.

In August 2019, he was named in Afghanistan's Test squad for their one-off match against Bangladesh. He made his Test debut for Afghanistan, in the one-off match against Bangladesh, on 5 September 2019.

In May 2022, he was named as a reserve in Afghanistan's Twenty20 International (T20I) squad for their series against Zimbabwe. He made his T20I debut for Afghanistan against UAE on 19 February 2023.

References

External links
 

1998 births
Living people
Afghan cricketers
Afghanistan Test cricketers
Afghanistan One Day International cricketers
Band-e-Amir Dragons cricketers
Brisbane Heat cricketers
Jamaica Tallawahs cricketers
Khulna Tigers cricketers
Lancashire cricketers
Melbourne Renegades cricketers
Melbourne Stars cricketers
Mis Ainak Knights cricketers
Nangarhar Leopards cricketers
Quetta Gladiators cricketers
Rangpur Riders cricketers
Spin Ghar Tigers cricketers
Saint Lucia Kings cricketers
Place of birth missing (living people)